Stroma may refer to:

Biology 
 Stroma (tissue), the connective, functionally supportive framework of a biological cell, tissue, or organ (in contrast, the parenchyma is the functional aspect of a tissue)
 Stroma of ovary, a soft tissue, well supplied with blood, consisting of spindle-shaped cells with a small amount of connective tissue
 Stroma of iris, fibres and cells in the iris
 Stroma of cornea, plates of collagen fibrils in the cornea
 Lymph node stromal cell, cells which provide a scaffold for other lymph node cells
 Stroma of red blood cell, encloses Hemoglobin proteins within the red blood cell
In mycology, a stroma is a tissue structure of some ascomycete mushrooms.
 Stroma (fluid), the fluid between grana, where carbohydrate-forming reactions occur in the chloroplasts of photosynthetic plant cells 
 Stromal cell, a connective tissue cell of any organ; supports the function of the parenchyma

Places 
 Island of Stroma, a now uninhabited island off the northern coast of Scotland

People 
 Freddie Stroma (born 1987), British actor known for playing Cormac McLaggen in Harry Potter and the Half-Blood Prince
 Stroma Buttrose (born 1929), Australian architect

Other 
 Stroma (musical group), a New Zealand chamber music ensemble

See also 
 Stromae (born 1985), Belgian singer
 Struma (disambiguation)
 Stromatolite, layered bio-chemical accretionary structures formed in shallow water by the trapping, binding and cementation of sedimentary grains by biofilms (microbial mats) of microorganisms, especially cyanobacteria
 Stromer (disambiguation)